Degeneration (Entartung, 1892–1893) is a book by Max Nordau which was published in two volumes. Within this work he attacks what he believed to be degenerate art and comments on the effects of a range of social phenomena of the period, such as rapid urbanization and its perceived effects on the human body. Nordau believed degeneration should be diagnosed as a mental illness because those who were deviant were sick and required therapy. These comments stemmed from his background as a trained physician, taught by the Parisian neurologist Jean-Martin Charcot.

Summary
Nordau begins his work with a "medical" and social interpretation of what has created this Degeneration in society. Nordau divides his study into five books. In the first book, Nordau identifies the phenomenon of fin de siècle in Europe. He sees this as first being recognised, though not originating, in France, describing this phenomenon as "a contempt for the traditional views of custom and morality". He sees it as a sort of decadence, a world-weariness, and the wilful rejection of the moral boundaries governing the world. He uses examples from French periodicals and books in French to show how it has affected all elements of society. Nordau also accuses society of becoming more and more inclined to imitate what they see in art. He sees in the fashionable society of Paris and London that "[e]very single figure strives visibly by some singularity in outline, set, cut or colour, to startle attention violently, and imperiously to detain it. Each one wishes to create a strong nervous excitement, no matter whether agreeably or disagreeably".

Nordau establishes the cultural phenomenon of fin de siècle in the opening pages, but he quickly moves to the viewpoint of a physician and identifies what he sees as an illness:The book deals with numerous case studies of various artists, writers and thinkers (Oscar Wilde, Henrik Ibsen, Richard Wagner and Friedrich Nietzsche to name a few), but its basic premise remains that society and human beings themselves are degenerating, and this degeneration is both reflected in and influenced by art. Hannah Arendt, in her book The Origins of Totalitarianism, refers to late 19th Century French society as embracing unusual or exotic types or individuals, such as criminals, Gypsies and Turks, and certain others formerly not seen as socially acceptable, so Nordau's position is not novel or isolated as social criticism.

Nordau identifies a degenerate component in the contemporary, widespread practice of spiritualism in France. He argues that excessive modernization leads to a return of the irrational, including renewed interest in magic. In this way, Nordau presents a reversal of the sociological theories of disenchantment and rationalization.

During the time of Nordau's writing, physical, physiognomic, or mechanical factors were still being regarded as causative in mental aberrations and malfunctions. Among the systems Nordau criticizes as degenerate and spiritualistic is Jean-Martin Charcot's systematization of hypnosis, which was an important predecessor to Freudian and Jungian psychoanalysis. He thus fails to anticipate Freud's rejection of physiognomy and corresponding emphasis on psychological symbols.

Politics 
Nordau did not coin the expression or the idea of Entartung, which had been steadily growing in use in German speaking countries during the 19th century. The book reflects views on a degenerating society held by many people in Europe at the time, especially throughout the Austro-Hungarian Empire. By the early 20th century, the idea that society was degenerating and that this degeneration was influenced by art led to backlash, as evidenced by the conviction of Austrian artist Egon Schiele for "distributing pornography to minors".

That was given legitimacy by the branch of medicine called psycho-physiognomy. Degeneration was accepted as a serious medical term. Not until Sigmund Freud and the ushering in of a new age of psychoanalysis, was this idea seriously contested. Freud remarked rather drily in his 1905 work Three Essays on the Theory of Sexuality that "It may well be asked whether an attribution of 'degeneracy' is of any value or adds anything to our knowledge". Although Nordau's work certainly reflects a reactionary strain of European thought, he also condemns the rising anti-Semitism of the late 19th century as a product of degeneration.

Europe was then undergoing unprecedented technological progress and social upheaval. The rapid industrialisation and the accompanying urbanisation were breaking down many of the traditional structures of society.

Nordau's views were in many ways more like those of an 18th-century thinker, a belief in Reason, Progress and more traditional, classical rules governing art and literature. The irrationalism and amorality of philosophers such as Friedrich Nietzsche and the flagrant anti-Semitism of Richard Wagner were seen as proof to Nordau that society was in danger of returning to an era before the Enlightenment.

Editions and translations
Degeneration has been translated into English by Howard Fertig, based on the second German edition of the text. Fertig's translation has been digitized and reprinted several times.

References

 "Max Nordau and His 'Degeneration'", Introduction to Max Nordau, "Degeneration", xi–xxxiv, New York: Howard Fertig, 1968.

1892 non-fiction books
Sociology books
Books about mental health